Costasiella  is a genus of sacoglossan sea slugs, a shell-less marine opisthobranchi gastropod mollusks in the family Costasiellidae.

The most recent diagnosis of the genus Costasiella is by the Dutch malacologist Cornelis Kees Swennen (2007).

Species 
There are 16 species in the genus Costasiella
 Costasiella arenaria K. R. Jensen, Krug, Dupont & Nishina, 2014
 Costasiella coronata Swennen, 2007
 Costasiella formicaria (Baba, 1959)
 Costasiella illa (Marcus, 1965)
 Costasiella iridophora Ichikawa, 1993
 Costasiella kuroshimae Ichikawa, 1993
 Costasiella mandorahae Jensen 1997
 Costasiella nonatoi Marcus & Marcus, 1960
 Costasiella ocellifera (Simroth, 1895)
 Costasiella pallida Jensen, 1985
 Costasiella patricki Espinoza, DuPont & Valdés, 2014
 Costasiella paweli Ichikawa, 1993
 Costasiella rubrolineata Ichikawa, 1993
 Costasiella usagi Ichikawa, 1993
 Costasiella vegae Ichikawa, 1993
 Costasiella virescens Pruvot-Fol, 1951
Species brought into synonymy
 Costasiella lilianae (Marcus & Marcus, 1969) - Clark (1984): synonym of Costasiella ocellifera (Simroth, 1895)

References

Costasiellidae
Taxa named by Alice Pruvot-Fol